Khirlepposi or Khirleppos' Melesh (Hirleppuś Mĕlĕş) is a rural locality (a village) in Tautovskoye Rural Settlement of Alikovsky District of the Chuvash Republic, Russia, located  west of Alikovo, the administrative center of the district. Population: 245 (2006 est.), mostly females; 539 (1926); 482 (1907); 141 (1859).

Etymology
The name of the village is derived from the Chuvash words "" (the name of the river flowing through the village) and "" ("beginning").  "" was the name of the first settler.

Geography
The Khirlep River flows through the village.

Cheboksary–Alikovo–Krasnye Chetai auto route passes near the village.

History
The village was first mentioned in July 1774, when Yemelyan Pugachev passed near it. First school in Khirlepposi opened in 1895.

As the village grew, some of its residents moved out to found new villages in Alikovsky (Small Melesh (or Pavlooshkan'), Toropkasy, New Selo (now it's Azamat), Khitekooshkan', Khoravary) and Krasnochetaisky (Melesh) Districts.

Until 1927, Khirlepposi was a part of Alikovskaya Volost of Yadrinsky Uyezd. On July 1, 1927, the village was incorporated into Alikovsky District and on December 20, 1962 it was transferred to Vurnarsky District. On March 14, 1965, it was returned to Alikovsky District.

Infrastructure
The facilities in Khirlepposi include a club, a library, a first-aid post, and a store.

There are five streets in the village: Tsentralnaya (earlier ), Komsomolskaya, Kooperativnaya, Pereulochnaya (earlier  and ), and Shkolnaya.

Climate
The climate is moderately continental, with long cold winters and warm summers.

Notable people
Anatoly Ivanovich Platonov (b. 1952), Head of Alikovsky District Administration (as of December 2007)
Gennady Sapozhnikov (1933–2004), scientist, biologist
Nikita Larionov, Chuvash, writer and poet (here young writer is creating first novel).

References

Further reading
L. A. Yefimov, "" (Alikovsky District), Alikovo, 1994
"Аликовская энциклопедия" (Alikovsky District's Encyclopedia), authors: Yefimov L.A., Yefimov E.L., Ananyev A.A., Terentyev G.K., Cheboksary, 2009, .
"Аликовскому району 75 лет. Очерки и материалы по истории района", под ред. Л. А. Ефимова, Шупашкар, 2002.

Alikovsky District

Rural localities in Chuvashia
Kurmyshsky Uyezd